Aviaq Johnston (born October 23, 1992) is a Canadian Inuk writer from Igloolik, currently living in Iqaluit, Nunavut. Her debut young adult novel Those Who Run in the Sky won the inaugural Indigenous Voices Award for English Prose. The novel was also a shortlisted finalist for the Governor General's Award for English-language children's literature at the 2017 Governor General's Awards, and for the Burt Award for First Nations, Inuit and Métis Literature.

She has also published the children's book What's My Superpower?, and received a Governor General's History Award in 2014 for her short story "Tarnikuluk".

Johnston was listed as one of the 18 Authors to Watch in 2018.

Literary awards

Works

Children and Young Adult Books 

 What's My Superpower? (2017) 
 Those Who Run in the Sky (2017)
 Those Who Dwell Below (2019) 
 Grandfather Bowhead, Tell Me a Story (2021)

Anthology Contributions 

 Taaqtumi: An Anthology of Arctic Horror Stories (2019)

References

External links
 Tarnikuluk
 Interview at hinaani
 Johnston at CBC, 2018
 

21st-century Canadian novelists
21st-century Canadian short story writers
21st-century Canadian women writers
Canadian children's writers
Canadian Inuit women
Canadian women novelists
Canadian women short story writers
Canadian writers of young adult literature
Inuit from the Northwest Territories
Inuit from Nunavut
Inuit writers
Living people
People from Igloolik
People from Iqaluit
Writers from Ottawa
Writers from Nunavut
1992 births